The Holden ECOmmodore is a hybrid concept variant of the Holden VT Commodore, developed by Holden in conjunction with the CSIRO. It was powered by a 2.0-litre four-cylinder petrol engine combined with an electric motor running on lead-acid batteries.

The bodywork of the ECommodore resembled the production VT Commodore sedan models, however it utilized a fastback profile, using the longer wheelbase of the VT Commodore station wagon models. It also previewed a revised headlamp design that would be adopted on the VX Commodore, which replaced the VT model in October 2000. 

The ECommodore  was first unveiled at the Melbourne International Motor Show in May 2000, and in 2001 it made appearances at the North American International Auto Show in Detroit and the Hannover Trade Fair.

It was further used as the VIP car during the 2000 Summer Olympics Torch Relay held in Sydney. The ECommodore was never officially planned to reach production, only remaining as a concept.

Currently the ECOmmodore remains little more than a marketing concept, the company since focussing its energy conservation efforts on alternative fuels. After its time in the spotlight, the ECOmmodore, unlike many concept cars, was not scrapped. It is currently part of the National Motor Museum's collection in Birdwood, South Australia.

There were reports of Holden planning to release a hybrid version of the Holden VE Commodore by 2010, in order to boost sales and export potential. These plans were not carried out on any model of Commodore, with any plans dying with the closure of Holden in 2020.

References

ECOmmodore